Victoria Coeln (born 20 December 1962, Vienna, Austria)
is an Austrian artist who lives and works in Vienna. Her work centers around how light, space and colour are perceived.

Biography 

Coeln studied Stage Design at the Academy of Fine Arts Vienna as well as Mathematics at the University of Vienna and the Vienna University of Technology between 1981 and 1985. After graduating, she assisted the set-designer Günther Schneider-Siemssen between 1986–1989 and built sets commissioned by European operas, advertisements and music videos. Within this field of work she began to realize her fascination with light and began to specialize.

She is best known for her large-scale, immersive, light installations that have been showcased on some of Vienna's most celebrated buildings. However, she doesn't only work three-dimensionally and has also created a two-dimensional image space series.

Her etching into dichroic glass slides is reminiscent of the preparation of printing plates in traditional engraving techniques, however, she uses the glass plates as filters through which to project light.

She builds polychrome light spaces that she calls "Chromotopes" that are developed on-site and installed temporarily or permanently in public outdoor and interior spaces. Coeln's natural chromotopes are built on the basis of sunlight illuminating her filters, while the artificial require projectors.

All her more recent work focuses around the manifestation of these Chromotopes within differing spaces. They are used as the setting for her portrait series, choreography and performances and are often accompanied by correlative music, creating public spaces that encourage social interaction.

Works 

 "Chromotopia Konzerthaus", permanent light installation on the facade of Vienna's Konzerthaus, Vienna, since 2007.
 "Chromotopia Stadtpark I – Painting the Night", permanent installation at the entrance of the Stadtpark/Reisnerstrasse, Vienna, since 2008.
 "Chromotopia St. Stephan", temporary light installation, Stephansplatz, Vienna, May 2011 to December 2014.
 "Chromotopia Kokoschka", temporary light installation on the Leopold Museum, Vienna, 2013.
 "Chromotopia Heldentor", temporary light installation, Vienna, May to September 2014.

Bibliography 

Peter Roehlen: "FARB LICHT SPIEL: Dichroic Glass in Fine Arts and Archictecture“, Prinz Optics, Berlin, 2013, p. 14–19. 
Doris Lippitsch: "Lichträume in Wien: Lichter der Grossstadt“, Bohmann, Wien, 2009, p. 32–47. (in German)
Peter Weibel & Gregor Jansen: "Lichtkunst aus Kunstlicht – Licht als Medium der Kunst im 20. und 21. Jahrhundert / Light Art from Artificial Light – Light as a Medium in 20th ad 21st Century Art“ (Ausstellungskatalog ZKM), Hatje Cantz Publishers, Ostfildern, 2006, p. 373. (in German)

References

External links 
 Official homepage of Victoria Coeln
 Victoria Coeln on Facebook
 http://www.shift.jp.org/en/archives/2003/11/victoria_coeln_color_spaces.html

Austrian artists
1962 births
Living people